Kogho is a department or commune of Ganzourgou Province in central-eastern Burkina Faso. Its capital lies at the town of Kogho. According to the 1996 census the department has a total population of 15,524.

Towns and villages
 Kogho	(3 780 inhabitants) (capital)
 Bassemkoukouri	(807 inhabitants)
 Bendogo	(1 122 inhabitants)
 Bissighin	(950 inhabitants)
 Kogho-Peulh	(78 inhabitants)
 Linonghin	(465 inhabitants)
 Rimalga	(196 inhabitants)
 Ronsin	(365 inhabitants)
 Santi	(573 inhabitants)
 Tangandogo	(564 inhabitants)
 Tanghin-1	(1 730 inhabitants)
 Tanghin-2	(591 inhabitants)
 Tanlallé	(778 inhabitants)
 Tensobtenga	(1 463 inhabitants)
 Tollinghin	(1 580 inhabitants)
 Zorgo	(594 inhabitants)

References

Departments of Burkina Faso
Ganzourgou Province